Dmitry Andreyevich Kulagin (born July 1, 1992) is a Russian professional basketball player for Zenit Saint Petersburg of the VTB United League.

Professional career
Kulagin started his professional playing career in 2009. On 12 July 2011, Kulagin signed a contract with Triumph Lyubertsy.

On 9 July 2012, Kulagin signed a one-year contract with Krasnye Krylya. From 2013 to 2015 he played with Triumph Lyubertsy / Zenit St. Petersburg.

On 14 July 2015, he signed a three-year contract with CSKA Moscow. On July 26, 2017, he parted ways with CSKA.

On June 25, 2021, Kulagin officially signed with Zenit Saint Petersburg of the VTB United League, and of the EuroLeague until it was suspended due to the 2022 Russian invasion of Ukraine.  He had spent the previous two seasons with PBC Lokomotiv Kuban, averaging 9.5 points and 4.6 assists in the 2020-2021 VTB United League campaign with them.

Russian national team
Kulagin played with the junior national team of Russia. He played at the 2009 FIBA Europe Under-16 Championship, averaging 20.8 points per game. He also won the silver medal at the 2010 FIBA Europe Under-18 Championship, and the bronze medal at the 2011 FIBA Under-19 World Cup, where he was named to the All-Tournament Team.

Personal life
His younger brother, Mikhail Kulagin, is also a professional basketball player.

References

External links

Dmitry Kulagin at draftexpress.com
Dmitry Kulagin at eurobasket.com
Dmitry Kulagin at euroleague.net
Dmitry Kulagin at fiba.com

1992 births
Living people
BC Krasnye Krylia players
BC Nizhny Novgorod players
BC Samara players
BC Zenit Saint Petersburg players
Medalists at the 2013 Summer Universiade
PBC CSKA Moscow players
PBC Lokomotiv-Kuban players
Point guards
Russian men's basketball players
Shooting guards
Small forwards
Basketball players from Moscow
Universiade gold medalists for Russia
Universiade medalists in basketball